M-2.4 highway was a Montenegrin roadway.

The M-2.4 highway served as an extension of the M-2 highway, serving Bar and Ulcinj.

History
The M-2.4 highway was officially opened for traffic in 1973.

In January 2016, the Ministry of Transport and Maritime Affairs published bylaw on categorisation of state roads. With new categorisation, M-2.4 highway was merged with the M-1 highway.

Major intersections

References

Sources

M02.4